Sandy Spring Bancorp, Inc. is a bank holding company headquartered in Olney, Maryland and operating in the Washington metropolitan area.

Current operations
The company operates the following subsidiaries:

 Sandy Spring Bank - a community bank serving the Washington metropolitan area. It operates 55 branches and 6 financial centers.

 Sandy Spring Insurance Corporation - offers commercial and personal lines of insurance as well as surety bonds, workers compensation insurance, and professional liability insurance protection.

 West Financial Services, Inc. - offers financial planning, wealth management, and asset management for high-net-worth individuals, businesses, and associations.

History
In 1868, farmers who were Quakers founded Sandy Spring Bank to pool their savings to make home loans to their neighbors.

In December 2001, the company acquired Chesapeake Insurance Group of Annapolis and renamed it Sandy Spring Insurance Corp.

In February 2007, the bank acquired Potomac Bank of Virginia for $64.7 million.

In June 2007, the bank acquired County National Bank of Glen Burnie for $44.1 million.

During the financial crisis of 2007–2008, the company received an investment of $82 million from the Troubled Asset Relief Program. The investment was repaid in December 2010, making Sandy Spring one of the first community banks in the Washington metropolitan area to repay its TARP investment.

In January 2009, Daniel J. Schrider was promoted to chief executive officer, succeeding Hunter R. Hollar. Schrider joined the company as a lender in 1989.

In May 2012, the bank acquired CommerceFirst Bank of Annapolis for $25.4 million.

In February 2016, the bank opened its first branch in the District of Columbia.

In August 2016, Sandy Spring Insurance acquired The Advantage Group.

In January 2018, the bank acquired WashingtonFirst Bank for $489 million, creating the largest community bank headquartered in the Washington metropolitan area.

References

External links
 
1868 establishments in Maryland
Banks based in Maryland
Banks established in 1868
Companies listed on the Nasdaq